Line 1 is a Athens Suburban Railway services or (Proastiakos) Rapid transit line in Athens, Greece, managed by Hellenic Train. The service connects Piraeus with the Airport. The line shares a part of its course with lines 2 and 4, but also with lines 3 at Athens. The first Suburban line was inaugurated on 30 July 2004, using 17 OSE Class 560 DMUs between Larissa Station (Now Athens) and the Airport. With the completion of the electrification of the sections of the line to Athens in 2017 and Piraeus in 2018. The line now exclusively uses OSE class 460 EMUs rolling stock.

History
The initial planning phase of the line provided for the use of express trains (Airport Express) from Piraeus to the Airport with intermediate stations only in Athens, Agioi Anargyrou, Neratziotissa, Kifissia and Dukisis Placentia, and with a journey time of half an hour. In the end, however, the need to connect the capital's international airport with the city's most central station, Syntagma, imposed the joint travel of Suburban and Metro from Doukissis Plakentias to the Airport.

Line 1 was put into operation on 30 July 2004, connecting Athens with the Airport without electrification. On 6 August 2004, one week after the inauguration of the line, the Neratziotissa was inaugurated. In 2006, the section from Neratziotissa to the Airport was electrified, which led to the addition of new routes along this section, operated by brand new Desiro 460 electrified trains. On 4 June 2007, the routes were extended from Athens to Piraeus. In July 2007, all Athens Suburban Railway services were transferred from OSE to TrainOSE.  

With the extension to Ano Liosia was electrification in 2009, the line underwent a track change, connecting the Airport with Ano Liosia exclusively by electric EMUs. On 8 August 2010, Metamorfosi station opened, while in December of the same year, the line's routes were extended to Kato Acharnes on the occasion of the completion of electrification in this section. On 5 April 2011, the Acharnon Railway Center was opened.

In 2017 OSE's passenger transport sector was privatised as TrainOSE, (Now Hellenic Train) currently, a wholly-owned subsidiary of Ferrovie dello Stato Italiane infrastructure, including stations, remained under the control of OSE. The line underwent another change of course on 30 July 2017, 13 years after its inauguration, due to the restructuring of the Suburban network on the occasion of the extension of electrification from Agioi Anargyrou to Athens central station. Then the itineraries between Athens and the Airport were restored with a new direct connection, exclusively with EMU trains. The route was extended to Piraeus again on 1 February 2018, after electrification of the remaining section.

Stations

See also
Hellenic Railways Organization
Hellenic Train
Proastiakos

References

Athens
Attica
Railway
Railway stations in Attica
Transport in Athens
Transport in Attica
Transport in West Attica
Railway stations opened in 1884
Railway stations opened in 2004
Railway stations opened in 2007